Nicolò Corradini (1585? in Cremona – 7 August 1646), was an  Italian composer and organist of the early Baroque.

Life
Corradini was a disciple of his predecessor Omobono Morsolino. He served as the organist to the Cremona Cathedral. Tarquinio Merula shaped the music scene in his hometown. In 1622 he directed the musical performances at the Accademia degli Animosi with a local noble who launched the institution. In 1635 he became kapellmeister for Merula as "maestro di Cappella delle Laudi".

Works
Alcuni concertati con instromenti, Book 1 - a collection of motets. (Venice, 1613) 
Ricercari a 4 (Venice, 1615)
Madrigali, con sinfonie de viole (Venice, 1620)
Primo libro de Canzoni Francese a 4 & alcune Suonate (Venice, 1624)

Recordings
Cremona e la sua tutela celeste Music for the Cremona's Cathedral (1610-1620). Psalms and motets by N. Corradini and Bernardo Corsi.  L'aura soave Cremona.
Corradini: 12 Ricercari & Mattia Vendi: Canzoni Federico Del Sordo (organ/harpshichord)

References

Italian Baroque composers
Italian male classical composers
Italian classical organists
Male classical organists
1580s births
1646 deaths
17th-century Italian composers
17th-century male musicians